The Giro della Romagna was a semi classic European bicycle race held in the Italian region of Romagna. After 2005, the race was organised as a 1.1 event on the UCI Europe Tour. The race was discontinued in 2011, and in 2013, it merged with the Memorial Marco Pantani, which also takes place in Romagna.

Winners

References

External links
Official site 

UCI Europe Tour races
Defunct cycling races in Italy
Cycle races in Italy
Classic cycle races
Recurring sporting events established in 1910
1910 establishments in Italy
Recurring sporting events disestablished in 2011
2011 disestablishments in Italy